Mesnil-Follemprise is a commune in the Seine-Maritime department in the Normandy region in northern France.

Geography

Population

Places of interest
 Several 17th-century manorhouses.
 The church of St.Jean, dating from the seventeenth century.
 The ancient chapel of Notre-Dame.

See also
Communes of the Seine-Maritime department

References

Communes of Seine-Maritime